Red Raider Rampart is a rugged ice and rock wall just east of the juncture of the Gatlin and McGregor Glaciers, in the Queen Maud Mountains. Named by the Texas Tech Shackleton Glacier Expedition (1964–65) for the student body of Texas Tech University (then known as Texas Technological College), whose athletic teams are known as the Red Raiders.

Rock formations of the Ross Dependency
Dufek Coast